Karin Maria Boye (26 October 1900 – 24 April 1941) was a Swedish poet and novelist. In Sweden she is acclaimed as a poet, but internationally she is best known for the dystopian science fiction novel Kallocain (1940).

Career 
Boye was born in Gothenburg (Göteborg), Sweden and moved with her family to Stockholm in 1909. In Stockholm, she studied at the Åhlinska skolan until 1920. She studied at Uppsala University from 1921 to 1926 and debuted in 1922 with a collection of poems, "Clouds". During her time in Uppsala and until 1930, Boye was a member of the Swedish Clarté League, a socialist group that was strongly antifascist. She was also a member of the women's organization Nya Idun.

In 1931, Boye, together with Erik Mesterton and Josef Riwkin, founded the poetry magazine Spektrum, introducing T. S. Eliot and the Surrealists to Swedish readers. She translated many of Eliot's works into Swedish; she and Mesterton translated "The Waste Land".

Boye is perhaps most famous for her poems, the most well-known of which are "Yes, of course it hurts" and "In motion" from her collections of poems "The Hearths", 1927, and "For the sake of the tree", 1935. She was also a member of the Swedish literary institution Samfundet De Nio (The Nine Society) from 1931 until her death in 1941.

Boye's novel "Crisis" depicts her religious crisis and lesbianism. In her novels "Merit awakens" and "Too little" she explores male and female role-playing.

Outside Sweden, her best-known work is probably the novel Kallocain. Inspired by her visit to Germany during the rise of Nazism, it was a portrayal of a dystopian society in the vein of George Orwell's Nineteen Eighty-Four and Aldous Huxley's Brave New World (though written almost a decade before Orwell's magnum opus). In the novel, an idealistic scientist named Leo Kall invents Kallocain, a kind of truth serum. The novel was filmed in Sweden in 1981 and was the main influence on the movie Equilibrium.

Later life 
Between 1929 and 1932, Boye was married to another Clarté member, Leif Björck. The marriage was apparently a friendship union. In 1932, after separating from her husband, she had a lesbian relationship with Gunnel Bergström, who left her husband, poet Gunnar Ekelöf, for Boye. During a stay in Berlin in 1932–1933 she met Margot Hanel (7 April 1912 – 30 May 1941), whom she lived with for the rest of her life, and referred to as "her wife".

Boye died by suicide on 23 April 1941. She overdosed on sleeping pills. She was found (according to the police report at the Regional Archives in Gothenburg) on 27 April, curled up at a boulder on a hill with a view just north of Alingsås, near Bolltorpsvägen, by a farmer who was going for a walk. The boulder is now a memorial stone. Margot Hanel also died by suicide shortly thereafter.

Legacy
Karin Boye was given two very different epitaphs. The best-known is the poem "Dead Amazon" by Hjalmar Gullberg, in which she is depicted as "Very dark and with large eyes". Another poem was written by her close friend Ebbe Linde and is entitled "Dead friend". Here, she is depicted not as a heroic Amazon but as an ordinary human, small and grey in death, released from battles and pain.

Boye is also model to the character Isagel in Harry Martinson's 1956 poem Aniara. Boye and Martinson had a close friendship in the 1930's.

A literary association dedicated to her work was created in 1983, keeping her work alive by spreading it among new readers. In 2004, one of the branches of the Uppsala University Library was named in her honour.

Works

Novels
 , 1931
 , 1933
 , 1934
 , 1936
 Kallocain, 1940

Collections of poems
 , 1922
 , 1924
 , 1927
 , 1935
 , 1941 (not completed, posthumously published)
 Complete Poems in English translation by David McDuff, Bloodaxe Books, 1994

References

Sources 
 Abenius, Margit. 1965. Karin Boye. Stockholm, Sweden. Bokförlaget Aldus/Bonniers. 
 Hammarström, Camilla. 2001. Karin Boye. Stockholm, Sweden. Natur & Kultur. .

Further reading

External links 

 The Karin Boye Society
 David McDuff's English translations of Karin Boye's poems 
 

1900 births
1941 suicides
People from Gothenburg
Lesbian poets
Lesbian novelists
20th-century Swedish novelists
Swedish-language writers
Swedish-language poets
Swedish lesbian writers
Swedish LGBT poets
Swedish LGBT novelists
Uppsala University alumni
English–Swedish translators
Drug-related suicides in Sweden
Swedish women novelists
20th-century Swedish women writers
20th-century translators
20th-century Swedish poets
1941 deaths
20th-century Swedish LGBT people
Members of Nya Idun